Utco (Hispanicized spelling) or Utkhu (Quechua for cotton) is one of twelve districts of the Celendín Province in Peru. Its seat is Utco.

References